Kwadwo Nyanpon Aboagye is a Ghanaian politician and member of the Seventh Parliament of the Fourth Republic of Ghana representing the Biakoye Constituency in the Oti Region on the ticket of the National Democratic Congress. In April 2022, he organized a free eye screening and surgery for the residents of Biakoye.

Early life and education 
Aboagye hails from Apesokubi. He holds a B.S.C in Civil Engineering from the Kwame Nkrumah University of Science and Technology, a certificate in corporate governance from GIMPA. He is also  a member of the Ghana Institute of Engineers and  the Civil Institution of Engineers, U.K.

References

Ghanaian MPs 2017–2021
1950 births
Living people
National Democratic Congress (Ghana) politicians
Ghanaian MPs 2021–2025